Stephen Edward Koss (1940 – 25 October 1984) was an American historian specialising in subjects relating to Britain.

Koss received his BA, MA, and PhD from Columbia University, where he was a student of R.K. Webb. He began his academic career at the University of Delaware, and became an assistant professor at Barnard College, New York City in 1966, and then a full professor in 1971. He was appointed a professor of history at Columbia University in 1978, where he had completed his bachelor's and master's degrees, as well as his doctorate; the doctoral thesis was turned into his first book John Morley at the India Office, 1905–1910 published in 1969, the same year as his biography of R.B. Haldane. He was also a visiting fellow at All Souls College, Oxford.  He served on the editorial board of The Journal of Modern History and held office with the North American Conference on British Studies. He died on 25 October 1984 as a result of complications following heart surgery.

The historian F.M. Leventhal observed that as Koss matured there was "an increasingly irreverent and ironic tone in [his] scholarship, a willingness to criticize as well as to condone". His death was mourned in several academic books published soon after, together with that of Alan J. Lee, who had also written on the history of newspapers in Britain and who had also died at a relatively young age.

Koss is best remembered for a two-volume work The Rise and Fall of the Political Press in Britain (1981, 1984), respectively covering the nineteenth and twentieth centuries. Neal Ascherson, reviewing the second volume in 1985, wrote: "Koss was the archive-cruncher of his age. But he had another gift, which was to make the imparting of packed information stylish, readable, often mockingly witty." The two volumes of The Rise and Fall of the Political Press in Britain were later published by Fontana as a single volume.

A tribute volume appeared in 1987: The Political Culture of Modern Britain: Studies in Memory of Stephen Koss, edited by J. M. W. Bean, with a foreword by John Gross (London: Hamilton).

Publications

 (editor)

References

1940 births
1984 deaths
20th-century American historians
20th-century American male writers
Barnard College faculty
Columbia College (New York) alumni
Columbia University faculty
American male non-fiction writers